{{Automatic taxobox
| name = Nomascus
| image = Hylobates concolor2.jpg
| image_caption = Northern white-cheeked gibbonNomascus leucogenys
| taxon = Nomascus
| authority = Miller, 1933
| type_species = Hylobates leucogenys
| type_species_authority = Ogilby, 1840
| subdivision_ranks = Species
| subdivision = Nomascus concolor Nomascus nasutus Nomascus hainanus Nomascus leucogenys Nomascus siki Nomascus gabriellae Nomascus annamensis
| range_map = Nomascus.svg
| range_map_caption = Map showing the distribution of Nomascus species
{{Leftlegend|#8c510a|Nomascus leucogenys - Extant}}

}}Nomascus is the second-most speciose genus of gibbons (family Hylobatidae). Originally, this genus was a subgenus of Hylobates, and all individuals were considered one species, Hylobates concolor. Species within Nomascus are characterized by 52 chromosomes. Some species are all black, some are light with a distinct black tuft of crown fur, and some have distinct, light-colored cheek patches. Nomascus is found from southern China (Yunnan) to southern Vietnam, and also on Hainan Island. One species, Nomascus nasutus, has been deemed "the most critically endangered ape species in the world".  All species in this genus are either endangered or critically endangered.

Classification
 Family Hylobatidae: gibbons
 Genus Hylobates Genus Hoolock Genus Symphalangus Genus Nomascus 
 Black crested gibbon, Nomascus concolor Tonkin black crested gibbon, Nomascus concolor concolor Laotian black crested gibbon, Nomascus concolor lu Central Yunnan black crested gibbon, Nomascus concolor jingdongensis West Yunnan black crested gibbon, Nomascus concolor furvogaster Eastern black crested gibbon, Nomascus nasutus Hainan black crested gibbon, Nomascus hainanus Northern white-cheeked gibbon, Nomascus leucogenys Southern white-cheeked gibbon, Nomascus siki Yellow-cheeked gibbon, Nomascus gabriellae Northern buffed-cheeked gibbon, Nomascus annamensis''

References

External links

ARKive - images and movies of the black-crested gibbon (Nomascus concolor)
Photos of gibbons
Gibbon Conservation Center
Primate Info Net Hylobates (Nomascus) leucogenys Factsheet

 
Gibbons
Mammals of Southeast Asia
Primate genera
Taxa named by Gerrit Smith Miller Jr.
Taxa described in 1933